KGVE 99.3 FM is a radio station licensed to Grove, Oklahoma. The station broadcasts a country music format and is owned by Mark Linn, through licensee Taylor Made Broadcasting Network, LLC.

References

External links
KGVE's webpage

GVE
Country radio stations in the United States